Cooking on High is an American cooking competition television show that premiered on streaming platform Netflix on June 22, 2018. The show's premise centers on cooking foods that contain marijuana as an ingredient. The guest chefs are professional cannabis cooks whose knowledge of infused food take a center role in their careers as private chefs and medicinal marijuana educators. The show is hosted by YouTuber Josh Leyva. Featuring cannabis activist and comedian Ngaio Bealum, who provides short segments on the science of cannabis cooking and introduces the "strain of the day".

The show's first season has received generally poor feedback from critics, with the Washington Posts Sonia Rao calling it "the worst food show on Netflix". However, Bealum's performance was positively reviewed by Rao as "the one redeeming quality". The program was originally shot as a web series, so the episodes are kept short.

The show was removed from Netflix in June 2021.

Episodes

See also
 Cooked with Cannabis, 2020 Netflix series with similar premise

References

External links
  on Netflix
 

2018 American television series debuts
2018 American television series endings
2010s American cooking television series
Reality competition television series
English-language Netflix original programming